Seeliger is a name meaning "blessed man" in German and Yiddish. It may refer to:

 Hugo von Seeliger (1849–1924), German astronomer
 Rudolf Seeliger (1886–1965), German physicist
 Thomas Seeliger (born 1966, Medebach), German footballer and coach
 Wolfgang Seeliger (born 1946), German choral conductor
 Dr. Nicholas Edward Seeliger (born 1980), German-American Humanitarian and Professor of Family & Community Medicine at Tulane University School of Medicine.

See also 
 Seeliger effect
 Seeliger (crater)
 Related surnames
 Seliger
 Selig (name)
 Seligmann
 Zelig (disambiguation)

German-language surnames